Paul Bradley (born 28 May 1955) is an English television actor. He is best known for playing Nigel Bates in the BBC1 soap opera EastEnders from 1992 to 1998, and also as Elliot Hope in the BBC medical drama series Holby City, a role he played for ten years from 2005 to 2015 and again in 2019.

Education
Bradley was born in Nuneaton, Warwickshire, one of six siblings (five brothers and one sister) born to Irish parents. Bradley was educated at St Benedict's School and the University of Manchester before joining the Royal Exchange Manchester repertory theatre company in the early 1980s.

Career
Bradley has appeared in a number television series including the roles above, The Young Ones, The Bill, Red Dwarf, Bottom, My Family and Alias Smith and Jones. He had a minor role in the multi-award-winning 2002 film The Pianist.

As a guitarist and vocalist, he co-leads the group The hKippers (the 'h' is silent) with Stephen Warbeck, Academy Award-winning composer of Shakespeare in Love.

In the summer of 2021, Bradley played Major Metcalfe in the long running West End play The Mousetrap.

Selected filmography
Holby City (2005–2015, 2019, 2022), Elliot Hope
Twisted Tales (2005), Mr. Pandemic
My Family (2002, 2004), Mr. Griffin
Doctors (2004, 2018), Patient with OCD / Billy Bourke
The Pianist (2002), Yehuda
C.U. Burn (1997), Doctor (one episode, Hata sa Leaba)
EastEnders (1992–1998), Nigel Bates
Alas Smith & Jones (1992)
Bottom (1992), Burglar
Murder Most Horrid (1991), Sergeant
Boon (1990), Clerk
Red Dwarf (1988, 1999), Chen
The Bill (1988), Henshaw
The Comic Strip Presents (1986), Jerry
The Young Ones (1982), Pilot

References

External links

1955 births
Living people
English male soap opera actors
English male film actors
English people of Irish descent
People educated at St Benedict's School, Ealing
Alumni of the University of Manchester
People from Nuneaton
Male actors from Warwickshire